The 2011 NASCAR Canadian Tire Series season is the fifth season of the NASCAR Canadian Tire Series. This season comprised twelve races at eleven different venues, seven of which were contested on oval courses.

Overview
The fifth season of racing had a few different race procedures for the 12 events to be run this season spanning across 5 provinces featuring 12 events. New procedures include a new rookie of the year format, the introduction of the wave around and three attempts at a green-white-checker finish. All of the races were televised on TSN in one-hour tape delayed episodes, excluding Circuit Gilles Villeneuve and Toronto which were aired live on the network.

The season started off May 28 at Mosport International Raceway, where 2008 champion Scott Steckly led most of race and went on to win the event. He won three events and finished in the runner up position 4 times on his way to capture his second championship over D. J. Kennington, who had a pair of wins. Long time road racer Robin Buck and Rookie Peter Shepherd III won their first career events respectively. Andrew Ranger won the two biggest events of the year in dominant fashion at Montreal and Toronto. Former champion Don Thomson Jr. retired after a lengthy career.

Drivers

Schedule

The 2011 calendar consists of twelve races at eleven different venues. Circuit ICAR in Mirabel, Quebec will make its debut in the series this year.

Results

Races

Standings

(key) Bold – Pole position awarded by time. Italics – Pole position earned by points standings. * – Most laps led.

See also
2011 NASCAR Sprint Cup Series
2011 NASCAR Nationwide Series
2011 NASCAR Camping World Truck Series
2011 NASCAR Corona Series
2011 NASCAR Stock V6 Series

References

External links
Canadian Tire Series Standings and Statistics for 2011

NASCAR Canadian Tire Series season

NASCAR Pinty's Series